Eric Abrahamsson (13 April 1890 – 3 November 1942) was a Swedish actor and comedian. He appeared in over fifty films between 1917 and 1942. He often worked with fellow comedian Ludde Gentzel.

Selected filmography
 A Man There Was (1917)
 Dante's Mysteries (1931)
 Tired Theodore (1931)
 The Red Day (1931)
 A Night of Love by the Öresund (1931)
 Black Roses (1932)
 A Stolen Waltz (1932)
 The Love Express (1932)
 Perhaps a Poet (1933)
 Dear Relatives (1933)
 Love and Dynamite (1933)
 House Slaves (1933)
 The Song to Her (1934)
 Eva Goes Aboard (1934)
 The People of Småland (1935)
 Munkbrogreven (1935)
 It Pays to Advertise (1936)
 He, She and the Money (1936)
 The Ghost of Bragehus (1936)
 Unfriendly Relations (1936)
 Witches' Night (1937)
 John Ericsson, Victor of Hampton Roads (1937)
 Happy Vestköping (1937)
 Thunder and Lightning (1938)
 Good Friends and Faithful Neighbours (1938)
 The Great Love (1938)
 Landstormens lilla Lotta (1939)
 Nothing But the Truth (1939)
 Kiss Her! (1940)
 One, But a Lion! (1940)
 With Open Arms (1940)
 The Crazy Family (1940)
 We're All Errand Boys (1941)
 Poor Ferdinand (1941)
 The Ghost Reporter (1941)
 Bright Prospects (1941)
 Goransson's Boy (1941)
 Tonight or Never (1941)
 Lärarinna på vift (1941)
 En trallande jänta (1942)
 It Is My Music (1942)

References

External links

 

1890 births
1942 deaths
Male actors from Stockholm
Swedish male film actors
Swedish male silent film actors
20th-century Swedish male actors
Burials at Norra begravningsplatsen